Liquid Haskell is a program verifier for Haskell which allows developers to specify correctness properties by using refinement types. Properties are verified using an SMTLIB2-compliant SMT solver, such as the Z3 Theorem Prover.

See also
 Formal verification

References

Further reading

External links
 

Formal methods tools
Static program analysis tools
Type systems